Eric Phillips (born 30 August 1954) is a Venezuelan sprinter. He competed in the men's 400 metres at the 1972 Summer Olympics.

References

1954 births
Living people
Athletes (track and field) at the 1972 Summer Olympics
Venezuelan male sprinters
Olympic athletes of Venezuela
Place of birth missing (living people)
Central American and Caribbean Games medalists in athletics
Central American and Caribbean Games silver medalists for Venezuela
Competitors at the 1974 Central American and Caribbean Games
20th-century Venezuelan people